Alexis Bwenge (born October 19, 1981) is a former fullback. He most recently played for the Canadian Football League's BC Lions. Bwenge was drafted by  the Lions (1st round, 8th overall) in the 2005 CFL Draft. Bwenge first signed with the Lions in May 2006 and he had one four-yard touchdown reception in the 2006 CFL season. From 2006 to 2008, he has played as kick coverage on special teams and as a back-up at running back. He played college football for the Kentucky Wildcats.

External links
BC Lions bio

1981 births
BC Lions players
Canadian football fullbacks
Kentucky Wildcats football players
Living people
People from Chaudière-Appalaches
Players of Canadian football from Quebec
Canadian players of American football